Bill Miller Bar-B-Q is a San Antonio-headquartered restaurant chain that focuses on barbecue food, accompanying side dishes (such as potato salad and coleslaw), and baked goods.

The restaurant started as a poultry and egg business in 1950 from a $500 loan. Founder Bill Miller later expanded the business into a fried chicken take-out restaurant in 1953 and later shifted into a barbecue restaurant.

76 Bill Miller Bar-B-Q restaurants cover the San Antonio, Austin, and Corpus Christi markets.

History
William T. "Bill" Miller and Ila Faye Miller co-founded a poultry and egg delivery business in 1950 from a $500 loan. The restaurant was officially founded in 1953 when they expanded the business into a fried chicken take-out restaurant. The menu eventually incorporated hamburgers, and then shifted into a barbecue restaurant. The second restaurant opened in February 1963.

Bill Miller Bar-B-Q was a family business. Faye Miller served as a cashier and hostess while raising their four children. The children were raised learning the operations of the business. They later worked in the restaurant during the summers and on weekends. When Miller planned a vacation to Europe between Balous Miller's junior and senior years of college, Balous ran the restaurant business that summer and then decided to make Bill Miller Bar-B-Q his career rather than going to teaching school. Miller semi-retired upon Balous' graduation in May 1966. As his brothers, John and Douglas received their degrees, they joined him in the restaurant business. The three brothers and their brother-in-law, Louis Vance, have worked together for over thirty years.

In 1992, Miller bought the Fiesta Plaza, a failed mall, and planned to donate it to the University of Texas at San Antonio. The Fiesta Plaza is now the Downtown Campus of UTSA.

In 1994, the street on which the first restaurant -shop- was located was renamed from Offer Street to Bill Miller Lane. 

Ila Faye died in 2008. In 2009 the company reduced its employee health care costs by 40% after it ended its PPO program and formed partnerships with area health providers. Therefore, medical providers receive reimbursement on a cost-plus basis.

Business model
In the early 1950s, Bill Miller Bar-B-Q was one of the first to offer quality food-to-go in five minutes, something almost unheard of at the time. Its concept of serving barbecued meats and fresh pies and breads on a daily basis from a central commissary was unique to its industry.. Miller designed the original barbecue pits he used in the 1950s and the large industrial sized ones used today, which can cook up to 2,500 pounds of brisket at one time in 18 to 20 hours.

The central office of Bill Miller Bar-B-Q, is located in downtown San Antonio adjacent to the San Antonio Police Department's former headquarters. The plant is built according to the U.S. Federal Government's meat-packing guidelines and is inspected routinely by the City of San Antonio and the State of Texas.  Bill Miller Bar-B-Q owns all its own real estate and buildings and operates its own distribution center.

See also
 List of barbecue restaurants

References

External links

 Official website
Interview with Balous Miller, March 23, 1995, University of Texas at San Antonio: Institute of Texan Cultures: Oral History Collections, UA 15.01, University of Texas at San Antonio Libraries Special Collections.

Restaurants in San Antonio
Regional restaurant chains in the United States
Barbecue restaurants in the United States
Restaurants established in 1953
1953 establishments in Texas